Jurong Health Connect is a community health project started in Jurong - a region in Singapore with more than half a million residents.

The project was initiated by then Acting Minister of Health Mr Khaw Boon Wan, and was officially launched on 3 July 2004. The aim is to develop a patient-centric, seamless, and accessible healthcare network for the residents in Jurong. Successful components of the pilot would then be replicated in other parts of Singapore.

External links
JHC website

Medical and health organisations based in Singapore